Vsetín District is a district (okres) within the Zlín Region of the Czech Republic. Its capital is the town of Vsetín.

List of municipalities
Branky - 
Bystřička - 
Choryně - 
Dolní Bečva - 
Francova Lhota - 
Halenkov - 
Horní Bečva - 
Horní Lideč - 
Hošťálková - 
Hovězí - 
Huslenky - 
Hutisko-Solanec - 
Jablůnka -
Janová - 
Jarcová - 
Karolinka -
Kateřinice -	
Kelč -
Kladeruby -	
Krhová - 
Kunovice - 
Lačnov - 
Leskovec - 
Lešná - 
Lhota u Vsetína - 
Lidečko - 
Liptál - 
Loučka - 
Lužná - 
Malá Bystřice - 
Mikulůvka - 
Nový Hrozenkov - 
Oznice - 
Podolí - 
Police - 
Poličná - 
Pozděchov - 
Prlov - 
Prostřední Bečva - 
Pržno - 
Ratiboř - 
Rožnov pod Radhoštěm - 
Růžďka - 
Seninka - 
Střelná - 
Střítež nad Bečvou - 
Ústí - 
Valašská Bystřice - 
Valašská Polanka - 
Valašská Senice - 
Valašské Meziříčí - 
Velká Lhota - 
Velké Karlovice - 
Vidče - 
Vigantice - 
Vsetín - 
Zašová - 
Zděchov - 
Zubří

References

 
Districts of the Czech Republic